An anchovy is a small, common forage fish of the family Engraulidae. Most species are found in marine waters, but several will enter brackish water, and some in South America are restricted to fresh water.

More than 140 species are placed in 17 genera; they are found in the Atlantic, Indian and Pacific Oceans, and in the Black Sea and the Mediterranean Sea. Anchovies are usually classified as oily fish.

Genera

Characteristics

Anchovies are small, green fish with blue reflections due to a silver-colored longitudinal stripe that runs from the base of the caudal (tail) fin.

The snout is blunt with tiny, sharp teeth in both jaws.  The snout contains a unique rostral organ, believed to be electro-sensory in nature, although its exact function is unknown. The mouth is larger than that of herrings and silversides, two fish which anchovies closely resemble in other respects. The anchovy eats plankton and recently hatched fish.

Distribution
Anchovies are found in scattered areas throughout the world's oceans, but are concentrated in temperate waters, and are rare or absent in very cold or very warm seas. They are generally very accepting of a wide range of temperatures and salinity. Large schools can be found in shallow, brackish areas with muddy bottoms, as in estuaries and bays.

The European anchovy is abundant in the Mediterranean, particularly in the Alboran Sea, Aegean Sea and the Black Sea. This species is regularly caught along the coasts of Crete, Greece, Sicily, Italy, France, Turkey, Northern Iran, Portugal and Spain. They are also found on the coast of northern Africa. The range of the species also extends along the Atlantic coast of Europe to the south of Norway. The anchovy appears to spawn at least  from the shore, near the surface of the water.

Ecology
The anchovy is a significant food source for almost every predatory fish in its environment, including the California halibut, rock fish, yellowtail, shark, chinook, and coho salmon.  It is also extremely important to marine mammals and birds; for example, breeding success of California brown pelicans and elegant terns is strongly connected to anchovy abundance.

Feeding behavior
Anchovies, like most clupeoids (herrings, sardines and anchovies), are filter-feeders that open their mouths as they swim. As water passes through the mouth and out the gills, food particles are sieved by gill rakers and transferred into the esophagus.

Commercial species

* Type species

Fisheries

Black Sea
On average, the Turkish commercial fishing fleet catches around 300,000 tons per year, mainly in winter. The largest catch is in November and December.

Peru
The Peruvian anchovy fishery is one of the largest in the world, far exceeding catches of the other anchovy species.

In 1973 it collapsed catastrophically due to the combined effects of overfishing and El Niño and did not recover fully for two decades.

As food

A traditional method of processing and preserving anchovies is to gut and salt them in brine, allow them to cure, and then pack them in oil or salt. This results in a characteristic strong flavor and the flesh turning a deep grey. Pickled in vinegar, as with Spanish boquerones, anchovies are milder and the flesh retains a white color. In Roman times, anchovies were the base for the fermented fish sauce garum. Garum had a sufficiently long shelf life for long-distance commerce, and was produced in industrial quantities. Anchovies were also eaten raw as an aphrodisiac.

Today, they are used in small quantities to flavor many dishes. Because of the strong flavor, they are also an ingredient in several sauces and condiments, including Worcestershire sauce, caesar salad dressing, remoulade, Gentleman's Relish, many fish sauces, and in some versions of Café de Paris butter.  For domestic use, anchovy fillets are packed in oil or salt in small tins or jars, sometimes rolled around capers. Anchovy paste is also available. Fishermen also use anchovies as bait for larger fish, such as tuna and sea bass.

The strong taste people associate with anchovies is due to the curing process. Fresh anchovies, known in Italy as alici, have a much milder flavor. The anchovies from Barcola (in the local dialect: sardoni barcolani) are particularly popular. These white fleshy fish, which are only found at Sirocco in the Gulf of Trieste, achieve the highest prices.

In Sweden and Finland, the name "anchovies" is related strongly to a traditional seasoning, hence the product "anchovies" is normally made of sprats and herring can be sold as "anchovy-spiced". Fish from the family Engraulidae are instead known as sardell in Sweden and sardelli in Finland, leading to confusion when translating recipes.

In Southeast Asian countries like Indonesia, Singapore, Malaysia and the Philippines, they are deep-fried and eaten as a snack or a side dish. They are known as ikan bilis in Malay, ikan teri in Indonesian and dilis in Filipino.

See also
 Sardine

References

Further reading

 
 Miller DJ (1956) "Anchovy"  CalCOFI Reports, 5: 20–26.
 Nizinski MS and Munroe TA (1988) FAO species catalogue, volume 2: Clupeoid Fishes of the World, Engraulidae, Anchovies Pages 764–780, FAO Fisheries Synopsis 125, Rome. .
 Pacific States Marine Fisheries Commission  Northern Anchovy

External links 

 "Fisheries Ebb and Flow in 50-Year Cycle" by Cameron Walker, National Geographic News (January 9, 2003).
 

 
Fish common names
Marine fish